The human gene ATP6AP1 encodes the S1 subunit of the enzyme V-type proton ATPase.

This gene encodes a component of a multisubunit enzyme (1 mDa MW) that mediates acidification of eukaryotic intracellular organelles. Vacuolar ATPase (V-ATPase) is composed of a cytosolic, V1, (site of the ATP catalytic site) and a transmembrane, V0, domain. V-ATPase dependent organelle acidification is necessary for such intracellular processes as protein sorting, zymogen activation, and receptor-mediated endocytosis. The encoded protein of this gene is approximately 45 kD and may assist in the V-ATPase-mediated acidification of neuroendocrine secretory granules.

References

External links

Further reading